Giselli Monteiro is a Brazilian former model and Bollywood actress. She made her film-debut playing Harleen Kaur in the 2009 Bollywood film Love Aaj Kal, directed by Imtiaz Ali.

Early life and career
Monteiro was born in Espirito Santo, Brazil. She started her modeling career at the age of seventeen and has travelled to Italy, Germany, France, Greece, Hong Kong, Singapore, Thailand and Philippines. She came to Mumbai, India in 2008. She began her acting career in Bollywood, portraying the role of the old-fashioned Punjabi girl, Harleen Kaur, in Imtiaz Ali's Love Aaj Kal which also stars Saif Ali Khan and Deepika Padukone. She was purposely kept under wraps during the film's promotion. Following the film's release, her identity was revealed, and it was also revealed that she had approached Ali through designer Anaita Shroff Adajania to audition for the role of Jo, Saif Ali Khan's girlfriend in the second half of the film, but, on his wife's suggestion Ali took her for Harleen's part, especially since he had not been able to cast for that role despite auditioning girls from all over India. She was appeared on the covers of the Indian editions of Harpers Bazaar, Elle, Marie Clarie and Femina.

In addition to acting, Monteiro has been a brand ambassador of Wills Lifestyle, Movil Mobiles and PC Jewellers in India. She has walked the ramp for Rohit Bal, Ritu Kumar and Ranna Gill.

In May 2010 Monteiro appeared on the Fantástico broadcast by Rede Globo in her home country, Brazil speaking about Mumbai. She next appeared in Always Kabhi Kabhi, a film under the Red Chillies Entertainment banner that released on 17 June 2011. Lately she appeared on Westside, the chain of fashion retail stores' new brand campaign Advertisement starting September 2011.

Quitting films
After a successful career in modelling Monteiro quit after three films altogether in 2014 to pursue architecture at the University of Vila Velha, in Espirito Santo, Brazil. According to her she never intended to be in films, and studying architecture was her passion that she wanted to pursue.

Filmography

References

External links
 
 
 

Living people
Year of birth missing (living people)
People from Espírito Santo
Brazilian film actresses
Brazilian female models
Brazilian expatriate actresses in India
Actresses in Hindi cinema
21st-century Brazilian actresses